Mohlala is an African surname that may refer to

Jimmy Mohlala (died 2009), South African football striker
Lovers Mohlala, (born 1975), South African former footballer
Mathibe Mohlala, South African politician

Surnames of South African origin
Surnames of Botswana